Albert Gordon may refer to:
 Albert Hamilton Gordon (1901–2009), head of investment bank Kidder, Peabody & Co.
 Albert L. Gordon (1915–2009), attorney and gay rights activist
 Albert Gordon, producer for Brockhampton